Lichtenau im Mühlkreis is a municipality in the district of Rohrbach in the Austrian state of Upper Austria.

Geography
Lichtenau lies in the Mühlviertel. About 33 percent of the municipality is forest, and 62 percent is farmland.

References

Cities and towns in Rohrbach District